The 2005 Nordic Golf League was the seventh season of the Nordic Golf League, one of four third-tier tours recognised by the European Tour.

Schedule
The following table lists official events during the 2005 season.

Order of Merit
The Order of Merit was based on prize money won during the season, calculated using a points-based system. The top five players on the tour (not otherwise exempt) earned status to play on the 2006 Challenge Tour.

See also
2005 Danish Golf Tour
2005 Finnish Tour
2005 Norwegian Golf Tour
2005 Swedish Golf Tour

Notes

References

Nordic Golf League
Nordic countries
Nordic Golf League